Âsım Gündüz (1880; Kütahya – January 14, 1970; Istanbul) was an officer of the Ottoman Army and a general of the Turkish Army.

During the Second World War he was the assistant of Chief of the General Staff Fevzi Çakmak.

See also 
 List of high-ranking commanders of the Turkish War of Independence

Sources

External links 

1880 births
1970 deaths
People from Kütahya
Ottoman Military Academy alumni
Ottoman Military College alumni
Ottoman Army officers
Ottoman military personnel of the Balkan Wars
Ottoman military personnel of World War I
Ottoman prisoners of war
Turkish collaborators with Nazi Germany
World War I prisoners of war held by the United Kingdom
Turkish military personnel of the Greco-Turkish War (1919–1922)
Deputy Chiefs of the Turkish General Staff
Recipients of the Medal of Independence with Red Ribbon (Turkey)
Turkish Muslims
Turkish Sunni Muslims
Turkish Army generals
Deputies of Kütahya